Mogens Jensen (born 20 May 1937) is a Danish rower. He competed in the men's coxless four event at the 1960 Summer Olympics.

References

1937 births
Living people
Danish male rowers
Olympic rowers of Denmark
Rowers at the 1960 Summer Olympics
Rowers from Copenhagen